Luis Salvador Carmona (1708, Nava del Rey – 1767, Madrid) was a Spanish Baroque sculptor who came from a family of artists.

Biography
His parents were of modest means, but when he showed artistic aptitude, they sent him to Segovia to study. This was followed by an apprenticeship in Madrid, at the workshop of the sculptor, Juan Alonso Villabrille y Ron. There, he established his style, participated in several commissions, and was able to open his own workshop in 1731. That same year, he married Custodia Fernández and they had four children. She died in 1759 and he married again; to Antonia Ros, who died barely two years later.

His first commissions as a professional involved stone work at several public buildings and sculptures for the Royal Palace (1750-1753). At the Royal Court, he made acquaintances who were involved in planning the Real Academia de Bellas Artes de San Fernando and, after its opening in 1752, he and Juan Pascual de Mena were named the Lieutenant-Directors of sculpture. His popularity was widespread and he worked in several locations outside Madrid, including Guipúzcoa, Seville and Navarra.

Although he had numerous assistants, it appears that they were closely supervised and that he provided the finishing touches to each work himself. Among those who trained with him were his son, Bruno, who accompanied several scientific expeditions as an artist, his nephews Manuel and Juan Antonio, who became well-known engravers, and the sculptor Francisco Gutiérrez Arribas.

In 1764, he was forced to reduce his work load, due to a serious illness. Contemporary sources described him as being so beset by "melancholy" that he could make only the most feeble efforts. This condition was aggravated by increasing difficulties with his sight, which eventually resulted in blindness. In 1765, he was forced to resign from his position at the Academia, and he died two years later.

Selected works
Sculptures for the retable (1743-1747), Parish church, Segura 
Divina Pastora (1747), Convent of Capuchins, Nava del Rey 
Christ (1756), Convent of Capuchins, Nava del Rey 
Pieta (1760), New Cathedral, Salamanca
Crucifix, National Museum of Sculpture, Valladolid
Flagellated Christ (1760), La Clerecía, Salamanca
Virgin and Child, Detroit Institute of Arts

Sources
Garcia Gainza, María Concepción. El escultor Luis Salvador Carmona (1990) 
 E. Lord, Luis Salvador Carmona en el Real sitio de S. Ildefonso de la Granja, Archivo Español de Arte, XXXVI, 101, 1953. 
 J. J. Martín González, Escultura Barroca Castellana. Fundacion Lazaro Galdiano, 1959. 
 F. J. Sánchez Cantón, Escultura y Pintura del s. XVIII, Ars Hispaniae, XVII. Madrid, 1965.

External links

 Commentary on his work, by María Concepción García Gaínza @ Arte Historia

18th-century Spanish sculptors
18th-century Spanish male artists
Sculptors from Castile and León
Spanish Baroque sculptors
Spanish male sculptors
1708 births
1767 deaths